Demurrage is the cost associated with owning or holding currency over a given period. It is sometimes referred to as a carrying cost of money. For commodity money such as gold, demurrage is the cost of storing and securing the gold. For paper currency, it can take the form of a periodic tax, such as a stamp tax, on currency holdings. Demurrage is sometimes cited as economically advantageous, usually in the context of complementary currency systems.

Theory 

While demurrage is a natural feature of private commodity money, it has at various times been deliberately incorporated into currency systems as a disincentive to hoard money and to achieve more efficient allocation of capital in society. In particular, for long-term investment financing, it affects the dynamics of net present value (NPV) calculations. Demurrage in a currency system reduces discount rates, and thus increases the present value of a long-term investment, and thus gives an incentive for such investments.

Unlike inflation, demurrage gradually reduces only the value of currency held: it functions as a negative interest (a tax) on currency held versus inflation that also reduces the value of savings or retirement funds and increases CPI. A positive interest rate is a subsidy.     Both inflation and demurrage reduce the purchasing power of money held over time, but demurrage does so through fixed regular fees, while inflation does it in a variety of ways. Inflation is not always easy to predict and it does not stay fixed through time, but the level of demurrage is fixed by the government.

Gresham's law that "bad money drives out good" suggests that demurrage fees would mean that a currency would suffer more rapid circulation than competing forms of currency. This led some such as German-Argentine economist Silvio Gesell to propose demurrage as a means of increasing both the velocity of money and overall economic activity. On the other hand, influential British economist John Maynard Keynes contended that Gesell's proposed demurrage fees could be evaded by the use of more liquid competing forms of money and that therefore inflation was a preferable method to achieve economic stimulation.

History 

Demurrage-charged local currency was successfully tested in the Austrian town of Wörgl between 1932 and 1934, as a tax collected for the benefit of the unemployed, until the Austrian central bank stopped the experiment. Similarly, in 1936, the Social Credit Party-led government in Alberta, Canada, introduced prosperity certificates in an attempt to alleviate the effects of the Great Depression, with holders having to affix to the back of a certificate a 1-cent stamp before the end of every week, for the certificate to maintain its validity. Local scrip systems, many of which incorporated demurrage fees, were also used across the United States during the Great Depression, and the Bankhead–Pettengill bill of 17 February 1933 was introduced in Congress to institutionalize such a system at the national level under the US Treasury, as documented in Irving Fisher's book Stamp Scrip.  

Bernard Lietaer also documents in his book Mysterium Geld the use of demurrage currency systems in Europe's High Middle Ages' bracteate systems and ancient Egypt's ostraka – dated receipts for the storage of grain – and credits these currency systems with the prosperity of those societies. One notable example of demurrage is the founder of the Mark of Brandenburg, Albert the Bear.

In earlier real-life experiments, demurrage on money has been demonstrated to significantly increase the velocity of money in circulation, even incentivizing people to pay their taxes in advance.

The major central banks' post-World War II policy of steady monetary inflation as proposed by Keynes was influenced by Gesell's idea of demurrage on currency, but used inflation of the money supply rather than fees to increase the velocity of money in an attempt to expand the economy.

Proceeds of the system 

In some instances, the demurrage fee is charged by some sort of central authority, and is paid into a fund. The application of this fund varies widely among both historical and proposed systems. In some cases, it is used to pay the costs of administering the tax. If the currency in question is run by the government, the demurrage fee can contribute to general tax revenue.

In mutual credit systems all positive accounts, or those over a credit threshold, are debited the demurrage fee if there is no trading (purchasing) after a certain period (e.g. a month or year after the last purchase). Typically the fee accrues to the administration account and so adds to the common credit pool.

Current examples 

The Islamic system of zakat is a form of demurrage. It applies to un-utilized assets on a per annum basis, at a rate determined by the nature of the asset. For cash and gold, for instance, the rate is 2.5% per annum.

The chiemgauer is a regional community currency in a part of Bavaria, using a demurrage system.

See also 

 Freigeld
 Prosperity certificate
 Seigniorage

References

External links 
 Taxonomy of money systems, with discussion of relationship of demurrage concept to others
 T.H. Greco. "Money: understanding and creating alternatives to legal tender". White River Junction, Vt: Chelsea Green Publishing, 2001.
 Bernard Lietaer. The Future of Money. Century; New Ed edition (February 1, 2002) 
 
 Freicoin
 F. Smith, N. Penchev, Quantum Money (2015) .

Local currencies
Currency
Freiwirtschaft

ru:Свободные деньги